Donncha Ó Cróinín (8 December 19195 June 1990) was an Irish scholar. He was the son of the sean-nós singer Elizabeth Cronin and the father of the historian Dáibhí Ó Cróinín.

Publications

References

1919 births
1990 deaths
Alumni of University College Dublin
Irish folklorists
Irish scholars and academics
Irish writers
People from County Cork